Jack Bushofsky is a former American football player, coach, scout, and executive. He served as the head football coach at Austin Peay State University from 1973 to 1976, compiling a record of 13–29–1.

Head coaching record

References

1930s births
Living people
American football guards
Austin Peay Governors football coaches
Austin Peay Governors football players
Carolina Panthers executives
Carolina Panthers scouts
Indianapolis Colts executives
Sportspeople from Pittsburgh
Tampa Bay Buccaneers scouts
Villanova Wildcats football coaches
Players of American football from Pittsburgh